Margherita Pillini was an Italian painter, active mainly in the late 19th century in Turin and Paris.

Biography
Pillini was born in Lombardy and married painter Marco Pillini. For many years, she was a resident of Paris. She exhibited in 1883 at Rome: Stracciaiolo di Quimper or Stracciajuolo di Quinper ("Silk-cocoon Carder of Quimper") and Charity; in 1884 at Turin, in 1884: Three ages; Blind Poorman; Portrait del Prince of Naples; and another del vero'' genre painting.

De Rengis in his criticism of the "Silk-cocoon Carder of Quimper" said: "If I am not mistaken, Signora Margherita Pillini has also taken this road, full of modernity, but not free from great danger. Her ' Silk-cocoon Carder' is touched with great disdain for every suggestion of the old school. Rare worth—if worth it is—that a young woman should be carried by natural inclination into such care for detail. This method of painting, opposed to solid colors, desires to be seen from a distance, leaving the eye with an infinite wish for peace."

In 2019, her oil paintings were for sale on an auction site and sold between £400-1600GBP.

References

19th-century Italian painters
19th-century Italian women artists
Italian women painters
Painters from Turin
Artists from Paris